2N or 2-N may refer to:

 2N or 2°N, the 2nd parallel north latitude
 MI 2N, a type of electric multiple unit running on the French RER rail network
 2N, a prefix labelling certain JEDEC transistors, notably the 2N2222
 2N, an indicator of a redundancy level in (for example) an uninterruptible power supply configuration
 Powers of 2 (2n)
 In genetics, 2n = x refers to a diploid chromosome number of x
 NJ 2-N; see New Jersey Route 17
 MI 2N series double-decker train; see RER A
HP 2N, ISO/IEC 8859-2 character set on printers by Hewlett-Packard

See also
 N2 (disambiguation)